Pettson & Findus: Fun Stuff is a 2014 German-Swedish live-action/computer-animated film about the characters, Pettson and Findus created by Sven Nordqvist. The film was released theatrically in Sweden on August 1, 2014.

Plot

Cast
 Ulrich Noethen as Pettson.
 Marianne Sägebrecht as Beda.
 Max Herbrechter as Gustavsson.

Swedish voices
 Claes Månsson as Berättare.
 Ima Nilsson as Findus. (Katten)
 Claes Månsson as Pettson. (Gubben)
 Allan Svensson as Gustavsson.
 Ewa Roos as Beda.
 Annika Rynger as Hönan.
 Vicki Benckert as Övriga Röster.
 Annika Herlitz as Övriga Röster.
 Anders Öjebo as Övriga Röster.
 Anna Sahlin as Övriga Röster.

Sequel
 Pettson & Findus: The Best Christmas Ever (2016)

External links

2014 films
2014 multilingual films
2014 computer-animated films
2010s German animated films
2010s children's animated films
2010s buddy films
2010s German-language films
German computer-animated films
German children's films
German multilingual films
Swedish animated films
Swedish children's films
Swedish multilingual films
Animated buddy films
2010s Swedish-language films
Animated films based on children's books
Films about farmers
Animated films about cats
Animated films about friendship
Films set on farms
Films with live action and animation
2010s Swedish films
2010s German films